The ISAA Goalkeeper of the Year was an annual award created by the Intercollegiate Soccer Association of America (ISAA) to recognize the best U.S. college soccer goalkeeper.  The ISAA began naming an annual men's Goalkeeper of the Year in 1983.  In 1986, the ISAA began naming a women's Goalkeeper of the Year and continued to award this honor for both men and women through the 1995 season, the last year that any player was named.  The NCAA recognizes these players in its record books.

Men's Goalkeeper of the Year
 1995 — Chris Snitko, UCLA
 1994 — David Kramer, Fresno State
 1993 — Bo Oshoniyi, Southern
Connecticut State
 1992 — Brad Friedel, UCLA
 1991 — Kasey Keller, Portland
 1990 — Juergen Sommer, Indiana
 1989 — Anton Nistl, UCLA
 1988 — Charles Arndt, South Carolina
 1987 — Bob Willen, Virginia
 1986 — Jeff Duback, Yale
 1985 — Warren Lipka, South Carolina
 1984 — Jim Leahy, Brandeis
 1983 — Jamie Swanner, Clemson

Women's Goalkeeper of the Year
 1995 — Maja Hansen, New Hampshire
 1994 — Jen Mead, George Mason
 1993 — Briana Scurry, Massachusetts
 1992 — Saskia Webber, Rutgers
 1991 — Heather Taggart, Wisconsin
 1990 — Karen Richter, UCF
 1989 — Jen Starr, Vermont
 1988 — Janine Szpara, Colorado College
 1987 — Amy Allmann, UCF
 1986 — Mary Harvey, California

External links
2006 NCAA Record Book - see p. 91 for men and p. 292 for women

College soccer trophies and awards in the United States
Association football goalkeeper awards
Association football player non-biographical articles